The Gołogóra Transmitter (Polish:RTCN Gołogóra) is a facility for FM radio and TV broadcasting at Gołogóra near Koszalin in West Pomeranian Voivodeship.

It entered service in 1965 and uses two antenna towers of different height. Both are guyed lattice steel masts with triangular cross-section. The smaller mast is 115 metres tall. The bigger mast, which was built in 1962, had originally a height of 226 metres. It was increased to 270 metres by mounting some further segments and a UHF-broadcasting antenna on its pinnacle.

Transmitted programmes

References

External links 
 http://radiopolska.pl/wykaz/pokaz_lokalizacja.php?pid=90
 http://emi.emitel.pl/EMITEL/obiekty.aspx?obiekt=DODR_N2U

Radio masts and towers in Poland
Koszalin County
Buildings and structures in West Pomeranian Voivodeship
1965 establishments in Poland
Towers completed in 1965